Dragons Alive is a television nature documentary series about reptiles co-produced by the BBC Natural History Unit and Animal Planet. The executive producer was Sara Ford, the narrator was Lloyd Owen and the music was composed by Elizabeth Parker. The series was first broadcast in the United Kingdom on BBC One beginning on 24 March 2004.

Episodes

External links
 
 

BBC television documentaries
Nature educational television series
2000s British documentary television series
2004 British television series debuts
2004 British television series endings